"A World Without You (Michelle)" is a song by Bad Boys Blue from their fourth studio album My Blue World. Released as a single in late 1988, it peaked at number 17 in West Germany for two weeks in November.

Composition 
The song was written and produced by Tony Hendrik and Karin Hartmann (as Karin van Haaren).

Charts

References 

1988 songs
1988 singles
Bad Boys Blue songs
Songs written by Tony Hendrik